The following lists events that happened during 1942 in the Union of Soviet Socialist Republics.

Incumbents
 General Secretary of the Communist Party of the Soviet Union – Joseph Stalin
 Chairman of the Presidium of the Supreme Soviet of the Soviet Union – Mikhail Kalinin
 Chairman of the Council of People's Commissars of the Soviet Union – Joseph Stalin

Births
 7 January – Svetlana Savyolova, Russian actress
 27 April – Valeri Polyakov, Russian cosmonaut
 19 September – Indrek Toome, Estonian businessman and politician
 21 November - Liudmyla Sheremet, Ukrainian anesthesiologist

Deaths
 14 February – Matvey Kuzmin
 14 August – Sabina Spielrein

See also
 1942 in fine arts of the Soviet Union
 List of Soviet films of 1942

References

 
1940s in the Soviet Union
Years in the Soviet Union
Soviet Union
Soviet Union
Soviet Union